Nsima Udo Ekere  (born 29 May 1965) is a former Managing Director of the Niger Delta Development Commission  (NDDC). He was the gubernatorial candidate of the All Progressives Congress Governorship Candidate for Akwa Ibom State for the 2019 election.

Early life and family

Nsima Ekere is a native of Ikot Oboroenyin, Edemaya Clan Ikot Abasi Local Government Area of Akwa Ibom State.

He graduated from the University of Nigeria, Nsukka in 1986.  He is married to Ese Nsima Ekere.

Career
Nsima Ekere has chaired the Akwa Ibom State Emergency Management Agency and simultaneously as Chairman of Ibom Power Company, the power generating company owned by Akwa Ibom State.

Entry into APC

Nsima Ekere lost the Primary Elections in the PDP for the 2015 Gubernatorial Elections to Udom Emmanuel. It was at this point, Nsima Ekere left the PDP and defected to the APC to contest for the 2015 Gubernatorial Elections in Akwa Ibom. Udom Emmanuel of the PDP emerged as Governor.

Nsima Ekere was the APC's Akwa Ibom State Governorship Candidate for the 2019 Governorship elections.

References

1965 births
Living people
Akwa Ibom State politicians